is a former Japanese football player. He played for Japan national team.

Club career
Ogi was born in Hiroshima on December 10, 1942. After graduating from Chuo University, he joined his local club Toyo Industries in 1965. The club won the champions 5 times (1965, 1966, 1967, 1968 and 1970). He became a top scorer in 1966 and was selected Best Eleven for 7 years in a row (1966-1972). He was also selected Japanese Footballer of the Year awards in 1965 and 1970. He retired in 1976. He played 163 games and scored 57 goals in the league.

National team career
On August 8, 1963, when Ogi was a Chuo University student, he debuted for Japan national team against Malaysia. He was selected for Japan for 1964 Summer Olympics in Tokyo and 1968 Summer Olympics in Mexico City. He played all matches in both Olympics. At 1964 Olympics, he scored winning goal against Argentina in first match. At 1968 Olympics, Japan won Bronze Medal. In 2018, this team was selected Japan Football Hall of Fame. He also played at 1966, 1970 and 1974 Asian Games. He played 62 games and scored 11 goals for Japan until 1976.

Coaching career
After retirement, Ogi became a manager for Toyo Industries in 1977 as Ikuo Matsumoto successor. He managed until 1980.

In 2006, he was selected Japan Football Hall of Fame.

Club statistics

National team statistics

Awards
 Japanese Player of the Year: 1965
 Japan Soccer League Top Scorer: 1966
 Japan Soccer League Best Eleven: (7) 1966, 1967, 1968, 1969, 1970, 1971, 1972

References

External links
 
 
 Japan National Football Team Database
Japan Football Hall of Fame at Japan Football Association
Japan Football Hall of Fame (Japan team at 1968 Olympics) at Japan Football Association

1942 births
Living people
Chuo University alumni
Association football people from Hiroshima Prefecture
Japanese footballers
Japan international footballers
Japan Soccer League players
Sanfrecce Hiroshima players
Japanese football managers
Olympic footballers of Japan
Footballers at the 1964 Summer Olympics
Footballers at the 1968 Summer Olympics
Olympic bronze medalists for Japan
Medalists at the 1968 Summer Olympics
Olympic medalists in football
Asian Games medalists in football
Asian Games bronze medalists for Japan
Footballers at the 1966 Asian Games
Footballers at the 1970 Asian Games
Footballers at the 1974 Asian Games
Association football midfielders
Medalists at the 1966 Asian Games